Enore Boscolo (born July 18, 1929) is a retired Italian professional football player. He was born in Udine, and played for 10 seasons (220 games, 53 goals) in the Serie A for U.S. Triestina Calcio, A.C. Torino, A.S. Roma, Lanerossi Vicenza and Calcio Padova.

External links
Profile at Almanaccogiallorosso.it

1929 births
Living people
Italian footballers
Serie A players
Udinese Calcio players
U.S. Triestina Calcio 1918 players
Torino F.C. players
A.S. Roma players
L.R. Vicenza players
Calcio Padova players
Taranto F.C. 1927 players
Association football midfielders